Meet Your Congress was a public affairs TV series on NBC and on the DuMont Television Network. The show premiered on NBC on July 1, 1949, airing Saturdays at 8pm ET. The DuMont series aired from July 8, 1953, until July 4, 1954.

Moderator Blair Moody (1902-1954), who hosted the radio and TV versions from 1946 to 1952, died of pneumonia and heart problems on July 20, 1954.

Episode status
As with most DuMont series, no episodes are known to exist.

See also
List of programs broadcast by the DuMont Television Network
List of surviving DuMont Television Network broadcasts
1949-50 United States network television schedule

References

Bibliography
David Weinstein, The Forgotten Network: DuMont and the Birth of American Television (Philadelphia: Temple University Press, 2004) 
Alex McNeil, Total Television, Fourth edition (New York: Penguin Books, 1980) 
Tim Brooks and Earle Marsh, The Complete Directory to Prime Time Network TV Shows, Third edition (New York: Ballantine Books, 1964)

External links
Meet Your Congress at IMDB
DuMont historical website

NBC original programming
DuMont Television Network original programming
1949 American television series debuts
1954 American television series endings
Black-and-white American television shows
DuMont news programming